The BrightDrop Zevo is a battery electric delivery van produced by General Motors for its electric commercial vehicle marque BrightDrop. It was unveiled at the Consumer Electronics Show on 12 January 2021. There are two models, the larger Zevo 600 (formerly EV600) and the smaller Zevo 400 (formerly EV410)

History
Rumors began circulating in June 2020 that GM was working on an all-electric delivery van, codenamed "BV1". According to earlier reports from December 2019, an all-electric van would be built at Detroit/Hamtramck Assembly. At the time, the two contracts for 100,000 Rivian EDV electric delivery vans ordered by Amazon and 10,000 Arrival Vans ordered by UPS were collectively valued at US$4 billion.

The BrightDrop EV600 was unveiled as the marque's first vehicle at the Consumer Electronics Show in Las Vegas, Nevada on 12 January 2021 along with the EP1 electric pallet cart; GM announced that FedEx had ordered 500 EV600s. The smaller EV410 was first shown that September; telecommunications company Verizon was the first customer for the smaller van, with deliveries scheduled for 2023. In April 2022, BrightDrop announced it had renamed its products; the EV600 and EV410 became the Zevo 600 and Zevo 400, respectively. In addition, the EP1 was renamed to the Trace (e-cart spelled backward).

GM partnered with KUKA, a close supplier, to build the first batch of vehicles in Michigan so they could meet their 2021 delivery target. GM was scheduled to shift Zevo production to the CAMI Automotive factory at Ingersoll, Ontario in November 2022. Some of the robots and tools made and used by KUKA to assemble the initial batch will be transferred to CAMI; CAMI staff have been using the initial batch to refine the production processes. Zevo 600 production at CAMI began on December 5, 2022. At maximum capacity, CAMI will be able to build 50,000 Zevo vans per year. Production of the smaller Zevo 400 is scheduled to start in late 2023.

In addition to FedEx and Verizon, the fleet management company Merchants Fleet placed the largest single order of 18,000 EV600 and EV410 vans by November 2021. FedEx received the first 5 EV600 vans from a 500-vehicle fleet order in December 2021, which they will operate out of their Inglewood, California facility; the delivery company increased its order by 2,000 additional units and Walmart reserved 5,000 units in January 2022. Consumer sales are scheduled to commence in 2022. In September 2022, Hertz announced it would order up to 175,000 electric vehicles from GM, including an unspecified number of BrightDrop Zevo 600 vans. BrightDrop announced its first order from outside the US in December 2022; it will deliver vans to DHL Express Canada.

It is anticipated the replacements for the Chevrolet Express / GMC Savana, scheduled for the 2026 model year, will also use Ultium battery technology and may use a smaller version of the Zevo platform.

Design
The Zevo range is based on the Ultium battery announced by GM in 2020. The body is made of composite materials incorporating recycled content, riding on a typical battery-electric vehicle skateboard chassis with the underfloor traction motors and battery lowering the vehicle's center of gravity. The chassis uses high-strength steel in the rocker panels, door reinforcement beams, floor structure, and side pillars extending forward from the front firewall.

Powertrain
In addition, more gentle or partial charging cycles can be applied, which would prolong the life of the traction battery.

The high voltage traction battery in the Zevo 600 uses 20 Ultium modules; for comparison, the GMC Hummer EV uses 24 Ultium modules and has an usable capacity of 212.7 kW-hr, so the Zevo 600 has an estimated capacity of 170–178 kW-hr. The Zevo 600 is capable of recharging at rates of up to 120 kW (DC) or 11.5 kW (AC).

A front-wheel drive variant is expected in the future.

Cargo

Driver assistance
Advanced driver-assistance systems include pedestrian detection, automatic emergency braking, and a rear-view camera. For the driver's convenience, the vehicle has parking assistance and may be locked, unlocked, or started remotely; fleets can monitor battery state of charge and track vehicle locations remotely as well. The steering wheel and seat are equipped with haptic technology to warn the driver of potential hazards through vibration.

Current displays use Android Automotive OS, but the interface may be customized in the future. Electronic systems and accessories are operated from the low-voltage (12V) battery, which is carried at the driver's feet.

Guinness World Record

References

External links
 

Electric trucks
Cars introduced in 2021
Electric vans